The 1940 Florida gubernatorial election was held on November 5, 1940. Incumbent Governor Fred P. Cone was term-limited. Democratic nominee Spessard Holland was elected unopposed.

Primary elections
Primary elections were held on May 7, 1940, with the Democratic runoff held on May 28, 1940.

Democratic primary

Results

General election

Candidates
Spessard Holland, Democratic

There was no Republican candidate.

Results

References

Bibliography
 
 
 

1940
Florida
Gubernatorial
November 1940 events